Nepachys is a genus of beetles belonging to the family Melyridae.

The species of this genus are found in Europe and Japan.

Species:
 Nepachys cardiacae (Linnaeus, 1760)
 Nepachys iranicus Svihla, 1987

References

Melyridae
Cleroidea genera